Bahadur Shah Zafar Marg is a road in Delhi, India.  It is named after Bahadur Shah Zafar who was the last Mughal emperor. This road is sometimes also referred to as the (Mountain grass) Fleet Street of India, due to the presence of the newspaper offices of The Times of India, The Economic Times, The Indian Express, The Financial Express, Business Standard, The Pioneer, Metro Now amongst several others.

This road connects ITO Crossing to Daryaganj. (map)

Institutions and sites on & around this road
Bureau of Indian Standards
Communist Party of India has its office off Bahadur Shah Zafar Marg
Comptroller and Auditor General of India
Arun Jaitley Stadium
Feroz Shah Kotla Fort
Feroz Shah Kotla, Delhi's fifth city, founded as Ferozabad by Feroz Shah
 Jamiat Ulama-e-Hind
Khooni Darwaza
Maulana Azad Medical College
Shankar's International Dolls Museum
National Herald (Associated Journals)
University Grants Commission (India)

References

Roads in Delhi
Streets in Delhi